Łukowo  is a village in the administrative district of Gmina Czersk, within Chojnice County, Pomeranian Voivodeship, in northern Poland. It is located in the Tuchola Forest in the historic region of Pomerania.

The village has a population of 111.

History
During World War I, the Germans operated a prisoner-of-war camp in the village. It held mostly Russian POWs, including many ethnic Poles conscripted to the Russian Army, but also English, Romanian, Serbian, Italian, Portuguese, French and Belgian POWs. Some 50,000 POWs passed through the camp.

During World War II, the local forest was the site of a massacre of 28 Poles from nearby Czersk and Mokre, committed by the Germans on November 4, 1939 (see also Nazi crimes against the Polish nation). There is a memorial at the site.

References

Villages in Chojnice County
Massacres of Poles
Nazi war crimes in Poland